Karen Greenshields is a reporter for STV News in Central Scotland.

Before joining STV as a researcher in 1995, Greenshields lived overseas for many years, including 12 months in Brazil, and had various stints as a researcher with independent production companies. Her degree in languages led to various jobs as an interpreter and translator.

Greenshields first worked for regional travel show Scottish Passport before becoming a weather presenter. She later joined the Scotland Today newsroom and specialises in arts and features, including the Edinburgh Fringe festival.

References

External links 

Living people
Scottish television presenters
Scottish women television presenters
STV News newsreaders and journalists
Year of birth missing (living people)